Come Home with Me is a 1941 Danish drama film directed by Benjamin Christensen. It centers on the character Helene Hannøe, an attorney who forms close relationships with her troubled clients while trying to solve their problems. It was the last of three 'social issue' films that Christensen made for the Nordisk Film Company, along with Children of Divorce and The Child.

Cast 
 Bodil Ipsen as Helene Hannøe
 Tudlik Johansen as Vera Halkær
 Johannes Meyer as Valdemar Nielsen
 Grethe Holmer as Rudi
 Eigil Reimers as Fritz Elmer
 Mogens Wieth as Asmus Asmussen
 Helga Frier as Frk. Stade
 Karen Lykkehus as Fru Hermansen
 Alma Olander Dam Willumsen as Husbestyrerinde Stoffer (as Alma Olander Dam)
 Peter Malberg as Olsen
 Lis Smed as Stuepigen Doris

References

External links 
 

1941 drama films
1941 films
Danish black-and-white films
Danish drama films
1940s Danish-language films
Films directed by Benjamin Christensen